Table tennis competitions at the 2016 Pekan Olahraga Nasional were held between 22 September and 28 September at ITB Jatinangor, Sumedang Regency, West Java, Indonesia.

Schedule

Medalists

Medal table

References
 

2016 Pekan Olahraga Nasional
2016 in table tennis